Unexpected is the debut studio album by German recording artist Sandy Mölling. It was released by Cheyenne Records on 13 September 2004 in German-speaking Europe. The first solo project to be released by a No Angels member following their 2003 disbandment, Unexpected was primarily produced by production teams Mute8 and Twin, with additional contribution from S. Kula, Pete "Boxsta" Martin, Nigel Rush and Pam Sheyne, among others. The album peaked at number 13 on the German Albums Chart and spawned the top ten singles "Unnatural Blonde" and "Tell Me."

Track listing

Notes
  denotes co-producer

Personnel and credits 
Credits adapted from the liner notes of Unexpected.

Musicians

 Pelle Ankarberg – strings, vocal assistance
 Camilla Brinck – vocal assistance
 David Clewett – bass guitar, vocal assistance
 Consensus Gospel Choir – vocal assistance
 Mathias Gamej – guitar
 Fredrik Landh – drums
 Joje Lindskoog – drums
 Ivar Lisinski – vocal assistance
 Celetia Martin – vocal assistance
 Anders Matthison – bass

 Maryann Morgan – vocal assistance
 Lisa Nordell – vocal assistance
 Mats Norrefalk – acoustic guitar
 Clas Oloffson – guitar
 Joacim Persson – bass, electric guitar
 P.E.T.E.R. – harmonica
 Nigel Rush – piano, rhodes
 Marc Sutton – guitar
 Twin – keyboard
 Amanda Wilson – vocal assistance

Technical

 Justin Broad – engineer, mixing
 David Cuenca – photography
 Niclas Flyckt – mixing
 Gothenburg – mixing
 Jeo – mixing

 Toby Lindell – mixing
 Pete Martin – programming
 Nigel Rush – mixing, programming
 Twin – programming
 Frank Zauritz – photography

Charts

References

External links

2004 debut albums
Polydor Records albums
Sandy Mölling albums